Hill City Municipal Airport  is a mile northeast of Hill City, in Graham County, Kansas.

Facilities
Its one runway, 18/36, is 5,000 by 75 feet (1,524 x 23 m) concrete.

In the year ending October 30, 2006 the airport had 14,600 aircraft operations, average 40 per day: 99% general aviation and 1% air taxi. Ten aircraft were then based at the airport, all single-engine.

References

External links 
 Aerial photo as of 17 March 2002 from USGS The National Map
 

Airports in Kansas
Buildings and structures in Graham County, Kansas